Yukiko Yoshida (born 12 July 1989) is a Japanese female handballer who plays as a left back for Omron Yamaga.

Individual awards 
 IHF Super Globe Top Scorer: 2019

References
 

  
1989 births
Living people  
Japanese female handball players